The Netherlands Agency for Aerospace Programmes (in Dutch language, Nederlands Instituut voor Vliegtuigontwikkeling en Ruimtevaart (NIVR)) was the official space exploration agency of the Dutch government until 2009.

Since 1 July 2009, the space-exploration activities of the NIVR are merged into the newly formed Netherlands Space Office (NSO).

See also 
European Space Agency (ESA)
Netherlands Space Office (NSO)

External links
nivr.nl, Nederlands Instituut voor Vliegtuigontwikkeling en Ruimtevaart (NIVR) (Netherlands Agency for Aerospace Programmes) official website (website in Dutch language).  Accessed 12 February 2010.
spaceoffice.nl, Netherlands Space Office (NSO) official website (website in Dutch language; toggle switch to English-language version offered in top bar).  Accessed 12 February 2010.

Government agencies of the Netherlands
Government agencies disestablished in 2009
Science and technology in the Netherlands
Space agencies